Bartolomeo di Passano (1594–1650) was a senator of the Republic of Genoa and Commissioner General of the armed forces.

Family
Bartolomeo was born in 1594, the son of Stefano di Passano, a governor of Corsica, and Ortensia Bondenara. In 1624 he married Bettina Garbarina. They had two sons and two daughters.

Career
In 1636 Bartolomeo became governor of Savona, but he resigned upon election to the senate soon afterwards. He was sent as ambassador extraordinary to France in 1639, to congratulate Louis XIII on the birth of his son, and again in 1643 to convey the Republic of Genoa’s condolences on the death of Louis XIII and congratulations on the accession of Louis XIV. In 1645 he was again appointed Governor of Savona and Commissioner General of arms, in which capacity he was involved in the Battle of Orbetello (June 1646).

He died on 29 May 1650, aged 56.

References

1594 births
1650 deaths
17th-century Italian nobility
Ambassadors of the Republic of Genoa